Long Play Album is the first album by the Dutch soundalike studio group Stars on 45, released on the CNR Records label in the Netherlands in 1981. In the US, the album was retitled Stars on Long Play, released on Atlantic Records' sublabel Radio Records and credited to 'Stars On'. In the UK, Ireland, Australia and New Zealand the group was renamed 'Starsound' (on certain releases spelt StarSound or Star Sound) and the album itself was listed as Stars on 45 or Stars on 45 - The Album and released by CBS Records. In Spanish-speaking countries, both the group and the album were launched under a fourth name: Estrellas en 45. Stars on 45 was also one of the very few Western pop albums to be officially released in the Soviet Union and large parts of the Eastern Bloc on the state-owned Melodiya label, credited to Stars on 45 but the Russian title of the album translates as Discothèque Stars and in Czechoslovakia on the state-owned Opus label as "Stars on 45". In the Philippines, it was released under the title Stars on 45 Long Play Album (manufactured and printed by Dyna Products, Inc. under license from PhonoGram International B.V., using the Mercury label [violet background, silver foreground]).

Following the chart success of the first "Stars on 45" single, producer Jaap Eggermont took the original 12" mix of the medley, a re-recording of the Canadian bootleg release "Let's Do It In The 80s - Great Hits" a.k.a. "Bits and Pieces III", which included both excerpts from various hits from the 1950s, 1960s and 1970s as well as the four-minute Beatles cover segment ("No Reply"/"I'll Be Back"/"Drive My Car"/"Do You Want to Know a Secret"/"We Can Work It Out"/"I Should Have Known Better"/"Nowhere Man"/"You're Going to Lose That Girl") and divided it into two separate medleys. The Beatles part was extended to a whole 16-minute medley which took up the entire Side A of the vinyl album, with excerpts from another 21 Beatles titles plus George Harrison's solo hit "My Sweet Lord" being recorded and added plus two reprises of the "Stars On 45" theme.

The remainder of the original 12" mix was re-edited and placed as track one on Side B, coupling recent pop and disco hits like Heatwave's "Boogie Nights", Lipps Inc.'s "Funky Town", Penny McLean's "Lady Bump" and The Buggles' "Video Killed The Radio Star" with classic chart hits like Shocking Blue's "Venus" and The Archies' "Sugar Sugar" - both of which had been included on the 7" version of the Beatles medley along with an uncredited musical reference to The Sparks' 1979 hit single "Beat the Clock" -, The Everly Brothers' "Cathy's Clown", Roy Orbison's "Only The Lonely", Martha and the Vandellas' "Jimmy Mack", The Fortunes' "Here Comes That Rainy Day Feeling" and Brian Hyland's "Itsy Bitsy Teenie Weenie Yellow Polka Dot Bikini"—the latter, however, not on the North American editions of the album because of copyright issues. This medley also features uncredited instrumental references to The S.O.S. Band’s "Take Your Time (Do It Right)" and Sparkle Tuhran & Friends’ “Handsome Man”.

Side B of the album continued with two further medleys performed by Dutch rock revival band Long Tall Ernie & the Shakers. These two titles, "Do You Remember" and "Golden Years of Rock and Roll", had been hits in The Netherlands as early as in 1977 and 1978 respectively and had also been produced by Stars on 45 producer Jaap Eggermont.

The Long Play Album/Stars On Long Play/Stars On 45 album and its concept was a smash success as it not only reached #7 in the Netherlands, but managed to top both the U.K. and the Australian charts and also reached #9 on the U.S. charts.

The last four minutes of the album version of the Beatles medley ("Good Day Sunshine"/"My Sweet Lord"/"Here Comes the Sun"/"While My Guitar Gently Weeps"/"Taxman"/"A Hard Day's Night"/"Things We Said Today"/"If I Fell"/"You Can't Do That"/"Please Please Me"/"I Want to Hold Your Hand"/"Stars On 45") was in the autumn of 1981 released as the follow-up single in the US under the title "Stars On 45 Medley Part 2" (#67 on Billboard Hot 100). The second single in Europe and most other parts of the world was instead a medley of ABBA hits released under the title "More Stars" (confusingly also the title of the third US single, but an entirely different medley) and was later that same year extended for inclusion on the second Stars On 45 album.

The Long Play Album/Stars On Long Play/Stars On 45 album in its entirety and in its original form remains was re-released digitally in September 2021, although most of the album had already appeared on CD prior.

Cover

The cover of the European CNR Records/Red Bullet release of this album only listed the medley tracks and a short producer credit. It contained no pictures or other artwork. The lettering was set in an old fashioned telex-style font.

The US release had a cover in the style of a newspaper with the headline being the album title, the byline "Performed by Stars On" and using a black-and-white photo of 1950s movie goers wearing 3-D glasses. Bursting through the photo is a big, silver, five-pointed star. The rest of the cover is the track listing for the side one medley in newspaper font.

Track listing

Side A
1. "Beatles Medley", performed by Stars On 45/Stars On/Starsound - 15:58 (US: 15:33)

All tracks written by John Lennon and Paul McCartney unless otherwise noted
"Stars on 45" (Eggermont, Duiser)
"No Reply"
"I'll Be Back"
"Drive My Car"
"Do You Want to Know a Secret"
"We Can Work It Out"
"I Should Have Known Better"
"Nowhere Man"
"You're Going to Lose That Girl"
"Ticket to Ride"
"The Word"
"Eleanor Rigby"
"Every Little Thing"
"And Your Bird Can Sing"
"Get Back"
"Eight Days a Week"
"It Won't Be Long"
"Day Tripper"
"Wait"
"Stars on 45" (Eggermont, Duiser)
"Good Day Sunshine"
"My Sweet Lord" (Harrison)
"Here Comes the Sun" (Harrison)
"While My Guitar Gently Weeps" (Harrison)
"Taxman" (Harrison)
"A Hard Day's Night"
"Things We Said Today"
"If I Fell"
"You Can't Do That"
"Please Please Me"
"From Me to You" (song not included on the US release)
"I Want to Hold Your Hand"
"Stars on 45" (Eggermont, Duiser)

Side B
1. "Medley" (aka “Boogie Nights and Other Hits”) performed by Stars On 45/Stars On/Starsound - 8:08 (US: - 7:25)
"Stars on 45" (Eggermont, Duiser)
"Boogie Nights" (Temperton)
"Funkytown" (Greenberg)
"Video Killed the Radio Star" (Horn, Downes, Wooley)
"Venus" (van Leeuwen)
"Sugar, Sugar" (Kim, Barry)
"Cathy's Clown" (Everly, Everly)
"Breaking Up Is Hard to Do" (Sedaka, Greenfield) (not included on the US release)
"Only the Lonely" (Orbison, Melson)
"Lady Bump" (Levay, Kunze)
"Jimmy Mack" (Holland, Dozier, Holland)
"Here Comes That Rainy Day Feeling Again" (Cook, Greenaway, Instone)
"Itsy Bitsy Teenie Weenie Yellow Polka Dot Bikini" (Vance, Pockriss) (not included on the US release)
"Stars on 45" (Eggermont, Duiser)

2. "Do You Remember" a.k.a. "Rock 'n Roll Medley" performed by Long Tall Ernie and The Shakers - 4:31
"Do You Remember"
"Lucille" (Collins, Penniman)
"Bird Dog" (Bryant)
"Runaway" (Shannon, Crook)
"Do You Remember"
"Bread and Butter" (Parks, Turnbow)
"That's All Right (Mama)" (Crudup)
"Rip It Up" (Blackwell, Marascalco)
"Jenny, Jenny" (Johnson, Penniman)

3. "Golden Years of Rock & Roll" performed by Long Tall Ernie and The Shakers - 4:26
"Golden Years of Rock & Roll" (Treffers, Britnell)
"Sherry" (Gaudio) (not included on the US release)
"Wooly Bully" (Thomas, Smith)
"Golden Years of Rock & Roll" (Treffers, Britnell)
"Buona Sera" (De Rose, Sigman)
"Slippin' and Slidin'" (Penniman, Bocage, Collins, Smith)
"Nut Rocker" (Tchaikowsky, Fowler)
"Golden Years of Rock & Roll" (Treffers, Britnell)
"At the Hop" (Singer, Medora, White)

Personnel
 Bas Muys - vocals (John Lennon)
 Okkie Huysdens - vocals (Paul McCartney)
 Hans Vermeulen - vocals (George Harrison)
 Jody Pijper - vocals
 Long Tall Ernie and the Shakers - performers

Production
 Jaap Eggermont - record producer
 Martin Duiser - musical arranger

Charts

Weekly charts

Year-end charts

Sales and certifications

References

Sources and external links
 
 
 Rateyourmusic.com biography and discography
 Dutch biography and discography
 [ Billboard.com biography and chart history]
 Official Charts, UK chart history
 Dutch chart history

Stars on 45 albums
1981 debut albums